Anshel–Anshel–Goldfeld protocol, also known as a commutator key exchange, is a key-exchange protocol using nonabelian groups. It was invented by Drs. Michael Anshel, Iris Anshel, and Dorian Goldfeld. Unlike other group-based protocols, it does not employ any commuting or commutative subgroups of a given platform group and can use any nonabelian group with efficiently computable normal forms. It is often discussed specifically in application of braid groups, which notably are infinite (and the group elements can take variable quantities of space to represent). The computed shared secret is an element of the group, so in practice this scheme must be accompanied with a sufficiently secure compressive hash function to normalize the group element to a usable bitstring.

Description 
Let  be a fixed nonabelian group called a platform group.

Alice's public/private information:

Based on that sequence she computes the product .

Bob's public/private information:

Based on that sequence he computes the product .

Transitions:

 Alice sends a tuple  to Bob.
 Bob sends a tuple  to Alice.

Shared key:

 Alice computes  as a product .
 Bob computes  as a product .

Security
(An 'indirect' attack would consist of trying to find  directly, which would require some additional special structure of the group.)

Solving for a suitable  given the conjugation relations is called the conjugation problem, and substantial research has been done on attacks to the conjugacy problem on braid groups, although no full efficient solution has achieved.

See also
 Algebraic Eraser
 Group-based cryptography

References 

Cryptographic protocols